Michael Gore (born March 5, 1951) is an American composer. Gore is the younger brother of singer-songwriter Lesley Gore.

Biography
A 1969 graduate of the Dwight-Englewood School, Gore received the school's Distinguished Alumni Award in 2004.

Gore, along with lyricist Dean Pitchford, won the Oscar in 1981 for Best Original Song for "Fame", from the film of the same title. He also won the award that year for Best Original Score.

Gore, alongside his long-term partner Lawrence D. Cohen, later collaborated with Pitchford on Carrie: The Musical, a show based on Stephen King's first published novel from 1974. The show, as directed by Terry Hands of the Royal Shakespeare Company, became one of Broadway's most infamous flops, receiving polarized reviews from theater critics. Despite reactive audiences and positive comparisons to The Rocky Horror Show, investors swiftly pulled their resources from the production. The show would become an underground cult classic and, in the late 2000s, Gore and the creative team heavily revised it for a 2012 revival. The revival, which is more in-line with the creative team's original vision of the work, opened to critical acclaim and became a licensed property available for purchase. Two of his songs, with lyrics by Lynn Ahrens, were featured in the 2003 movie Camp.

He also composed the theme and score for the 1983 hit film Terms of Endearment, starring Shirley MacLaine and Debra Winger, notching a hit on the Adult Contemporary chart under his own name with the "Theme" from this film. The single for "Terms of Endearment" spent six weeks on the Billboard Hot 100, peaking at number 84 in April 1984.

Songs

Filmography
Fame (1980)
Terms of Endearment (1983)
Pretty in Pink (1986)
Broadcast News (additional music) (1987)
Generations (1989–1991)
Don't Tell Her It's Me (1990)
Defending Your Life (1991)
The Butcher's Wife (1991)
Mr. Wonderful (1993)
Central Park West (2nd season theme) (1996)
Superstar (1999)
Camp (2003) songs

References

External links 

1951 births
20th-century American Jews
21st-century American Jews
American film score composers
American male film score composers
American male songwriters
American musical theatre composers
Best Original Music Score Academy Award winners
Best Original Song Academy Award-winning songwriters
Dwight-Englewood School alumni
Golden Globe Award-winning musicians
Jewish American film score composers
Jewish American musicians
Jewish American songwriters
Living people
Male musical theatre composers
Musicians from Brooklyn
Songwriters from New York (state)